Gerard Casey, Irish artist, was born, lives and works in Kilkenny, Ireland.  He studied in Limerick, and Cork, Ireland and Ontario, in Canada Colleges of Art.  He has had many exhibitions all around Ireland.

Gerard Casey has been a lecturer at Waterford Institute of Technology since 1985.

Performances
 Belltable Arts Centre, Limerick, 1993
 Sligo Art Gallery, Sligo, 1995
 Kilkenny County Council, Kilkenny, 1996
 Market House, Monaghan, 1996

Awards
 Oireachtas - Douglas Hyde Gold Medal awarded by The Arts Council in 1993; 
 Arts Council Travel Awards in 1991, 1993, 1994 and 1997;
 Tyrone Guthrie Centre, Annamakerrig - Residency in 1994.

References

External links
 Art Vitae: Gerard Casey

Irish artists
People from County Kilkenny
Living people
Year of birth missing (living people)
People associated with Waterford Institute of Technology